Aesthetic Group Gymnastics (AGG) is a discipline of gymnastics developed from Finnish "Women's Gymnastics" (naisvoimistelu). The discipline is reminiscent of Rhythmic Gymnastics, but there are some significant differences: in AGG, the emphasis is on big and continuous body movement and the teams are larger. AGG teams often consist of 6-10 gymnasts and some children’s teams are even bigger. Furthermore, apparatus are not used in international AGG competitions as they are in Rhythmic Gymnastics where ball, ribbon, hoop and clubs are used on the floor area. The sport requires physical qualities such as flexibility, balance, speed, strength, coordination and sense of rhythm where movements of the body are emphasized in the flow, expressive and aesthetic appeal. A good performance is characterized by uniformity and simultaneity. The competition program consists of versatile and varied body movements, such as body waves and swings, balances and pivots, jumps and leaps, dance steps, and lifts.

The length of the competition program should be 2.15-2.45 minutes. The competition dress of a group must be a leotard with aesthetic appeal considering the spirit of competitive sport. The size of the competition area, which is a gymnastics carpet, is 13 m x 13 m. The area should be used diversely.

The International Federation of Aesthetic Group Gymnastics (IFAGG) was established in 2003. The Federation has amongst others Australia, Bulgaria, Canada, the Czech Republic, Denmark, Estonia, the Faroe Islands, Finland, France, Hungary, Italy, Japan, Russia, Ukraine and Spain as members.

Age categories
In AGG, the teams compete in the following age categories:
 Children category 8–10 years
 Children category 10–12 years
 Children category 12–14 years
 Junior category: 14–16 years
 Senior category: over 16 years

In addition, there is a University students category where the gymnasts should be 17 years and over. It is only junior and senior gymnasts that compete in A-category international competitions, such as the World Championships.

Judging
The jury is composed of three judge panels: 

The technical jury will assess whether the program has all the required technical elements, which in AGG depends on the age group of the gymnasts, but which generally consists of:
 Balances: e.g., static balances, dynamic balances (e.g., tourlent, illusions, pivots) and balance series
 Jumps and leaps: e.g., tuck jump, scissor leap, cossack jump, ring jump with both legs bent, stag leap
 Body movements: e.g., bending, body swing, body wave, contraction, lean/lunge, relaxation, twisting
 Arm movements
 Series of steps, skips or hops
 Acrobatic movements 
 Flexibility movements: e.g., front line and sideline splits  
 Combined series

The artistic jury evaluates the gymnasts’ quality, the structure of the composition, and the originality and expression of the composition. 

The executive jury makes deductions for mistakes they identify during the program. E.g., insufficient extensions, unfixed shapes in body movements, heavy landings in jumps, unfixed shapes in balances, and lack of synchronization. 

The highest total score is 20.00 points consisting of: Technical Value (TV) 6.0, Artistic Value (AV) 4.0, and Execution (EXE) 10.0.

Aesthetic Group Gymnastics World Championships 

The international competition system for AGG is organized into three categories. These are designated as A, B, and C. The A-category competitions include the World Championships, the Continental Championships, the World Cup competitions, the Challenge Cup competitions (for juniors), IFAGG Championships, and other approved championships. The B-category competitions include international children's or junior competitions. The C-category is reserved for national championships.

Aesthetic Group Gymnastics is a discipline not currently recognized by the Fédération Internationale de Gymnastique. World Championships are organized annually since 2000 by the International Federation of Aesthetic Group Gymnastics (IFAAG).

Aesthetic Group Gymnastics European Championships

European Championships are organized annually since 2016 by the International Federation of Aesthetic Group Gymnastics (IFAAG). Since 2018, they are held on every two years.

Aesthetic Group Gymnastics World Cup 

World Cup is a series of competitions that are held throughout the year in the world. The World Cup series consists of four seasonal competitions held in different countries. There are two types, which are organised at the same time – World Cup is for senior teams and Challenge Cup is for junior teams. Teams receive points from each stage and best three results give the final ranking in World Cup series.

The winner of the first ever IFAGG World Cup, held in 2005, was SC Oscar from Russia, GC Piruett from Estonia was second and VVS Frida from Finland third.

AGG in Finland 
AGG is a very popular sports among girls in Finland. The Finnish Gymnastics Federation is one of Finland's largest sport federations with 374 clubs consisting of approximately 130,000 members. The most popular gymnastics discipline in the country is AGG.

The Finnish teams have won many the world championships and have recently got second place in the world championships

Some popular companies do to the sport in Finland are Vantaan voimisteluseura(VVS), Olarin voimisteliat(OVO), Attitude sports, ScVantaa, and kirkkonummen urheiliat(kirku)

In Finland, the AGG follows the rules of the Finnish Gymnastics Federation. It is possible to compete on three different levels or series in AGG: the championship level, the competition level, and the hobby level. The championship series is the most high-level series, as teams in this series compete in the Finnish Championships. The teams can decide themselves in which series they want to compete but the Finnish Gymnastics Federation has put out recommendations that they prefer to be followed. Children younger than 12 years old all compete in the same series.

According to the rules of the Finnish Gymnastics Federation, in the spring teams compete with programs without apparatus and on the fall with programs including apparatus, which is dependent on the age category. Juniors and seniors in the championship series do not compete with apparatus. In the autumn competitions, the apparatus are the following:

The points are given in categories from 1 to 10 in the age categories of 10-12 and 12-14 (competition and hobby series). Teams that are placed in categories 1-2 get to know their points. Teams are put in categories according to the following points:
 category 1: 16.50 – 20.00 
 category 2: 15.50 – 16.49 
 category 3: 14.50 – 15.49
 category 4: 13.50 – 14.49
 category 5: 12.50 – 13.49
 category 6: 11.50 – 12.49
 category 7: 10.50 – 11.49
 category 8: 9.00 – 10.49
 category 9: 6.50 – 8.99
 category 10: 0 – 6.49

References

Aesthetic group gymnastics
World Aesthetic Gymnastics Championships